Sai Ap Chau is a small island in the New Territories of Hong Kong. It is under the administration of North District.

Location
Sai Ap Chau is located in Ap Chau Bay (Ap Chau Hoi) of Crooked Harbour, west of Ap Chau.

References

Uninhabited islands of Hong Kong
North District, Hong Kong
Islands of Hong Kong